Dimya is a genus of very small clams, marine bivalve molluscs in the family Dimyidae.

Species within the genus Dimya
 Dimya acuminata Esteves, 1984
 Dimya adaia
 Dimya affinis Reeve, 1858
 Dimya argentata
 Dimya argentea Dall, 1886 - silver dimyid
 Dimya californiana - California dimyid
 Dimya coralliotis - coral dimyid
 Dimya corrugata Hedley
 Dimya filipina
 Dimya lima
 Dimya japonica
 Dimya maoria Powell, 1937
 Dimya melleni
 Dimya mimula
 Dimya molokaia
 Dimya rakhiensis
 Dimya rufaripa
 Dimya sigillata
 Dimya spondyliformis
 Dimya tigrina Bayer, 1971

References

 Powell A. W. B., New Zealand Mollusca, William Collins Publishers Ltd, Auckland, New Zealand 1979

External links
 
 ZipCodeZoo

Dimyidae
Bivalve genera